"So Lonely" is a song written and produced by American singer Mariah Carey and record producer Rodney Jerkins. It is a duet between rapper Twista and Carey, featured on his album The Day After and Carey's reissue of The Emancipation of Mimi (2005), subtitled Ultra Platinum Edition. It was unofficially released in 2006 as the third single from The Day After. The version on The Emancipation of Mimi serves as a sequel track to "One and Only" (also featuring Twista), another track from The Emancipation of Mimi, and is subtitled "One and Only Part 2". The version on The Day After serves as a sequel track to that and is therefore subtitled "One and Only Part 3".

The single impacted U.S. rhythmic contemporary radio on January 17, 2006. "So Lonely" reached number 14 on the Billboard Bubbling Under Hot 100 Singles chart, which represents the twenty-five singles below the Billboard Hot 100's number 100 position that have not yet appeared on the Hot 100. It failed to reach the top forty on the Pop 100 or Hot R&B/Hip-Hop Songs charts, though it appeared on the Rhythmic Airplay Chart. There was no official music video for the single.

There are two versions of the song: one called "So Lonely (One and Only Part 2)" from The Emancipation of Mimi (Ultra Platinum Edition), which has an extended intro and an additional verse by Carey, and another called "So Lonely (One and Only Part 3)" from Twista's The Day After, which has a shorter intro and features Carey singing the chorus and part of the bridge, but not any verses.

Charts

References

2006 singles
Twista songs
Mariah Carey songs
Song recordings produced by Rodney Jerkins
Songs written by Mariah Carey
Songs written by Rodney Jerkins